Shahrak-e Bisotun (also Romanized as Shahrak-e Bīsotūn) is a village in Cham Chamal Rural District, Bisotun District, Harsin County, Kermanshah Province, Iran. At the 2006 census, its population was 2,002, in 518 families.

References 

Populated places in Harsin County